The Intercontinental Dictionary Series (commonly abbreviated as IDS) is a large database of topical vocabulary lists in various world languages. The general editor of the database is Bernard Comrie of the Max Planck Institute for Evolutionary Anthropology, Leipzig. Mary Ritchie Key of the University of California, Irvine is the founding editor. The database has an especially large selection of indigenous South American languages and Northeast Caucasian languages.

The Intercontinental Dictionary Series' advanced browsing function allows users to make custom tables which compare languages in side-by-side columns.

Below are the languages that are currently included in the Intercontinental Dictionary Series. The languages are grouped by language families, some of which are still hypothetical.

It is part of the Cross-Linguistic Linked Data project hosted by the Max Planck Institute for the Science of Human History.

Amerindian

North America
Tlingit
Haida
Tsimshian
Wakashan
Nootka
Salishan
Bella Coola
Chehalis
Hokan?
Karok
Seri
Zuni
Nahuatl (Sierra de Zacapoaxtla, Puebla)
Chatino, Zacatepec

Northern South America

Chocoan
Emberá
Embera – Colombia
Epena – Colombia
Chibchan
Muisca – Colombia
Barí (Tairona) – Colombia / Venezuela
Cofán – Colombia / Ecuador
Barbacoan
Cayapa (Cha'palaachi) – Ecuador
Colorado (Tsafiki) – Ecuador
Páez – Colombia
Yanomaman
Yanomami
Ninam
Yaruro – Venezuela
Tucanoan
Siona – Ecuador
Tuyuca – Colombia / Brazil
Jivaroan
Aguaruna – Peru / Ecuador
Waorani (Huaorani) – Ecuador

Amazonia
Arawakan
Goajiro (Wayuu) – Colombia
Wapishana – Guyana / Brazil
Yavitero – Venezuela (extinct)
Mashco Piro (Yine) – Peru / Brazil
Waurá – Brazil
Baure – Bolivia
Moxos – Bolivia
Ignaciano – Bolivia
Trinitario – Bolivia
Macro-Gê
Karajá
Gê
Kaingáng
Canela
Tupian
Tupinambá – Brazil
Guaraní – Paraguay
Chiriguano – Bolivia
Aché – Paraguay
Mundurukú – Brazil
Sirionó – Bolivia
Wayampi – French Guiana
Cariban
Carib (De'kwana)
Panare – Venezuela
Macushi – Brazil / Guyana
Wai Wai – Brazil / Guyana
Panoan
Cashibo – Peru
Shipibo-Conibo – Peru
Yaminahua – Peru
Chácobo – Bolivia
Pacahuara – Bolivia
Tacanan
Ese Ejja (Huarayo) – Peru / Bolivia
Tacana – Bolivia
Cavineña – Bolivia
Araona – Bolivia
Catuquina – Acre, Brazil
Puinavean (Nadahup/Makú)
Hup – Brazil / Colombia
Yuwana (Hodï)? – Venezuela
Peba-Yaguan
Yagua – Brazil
Chapacuran
Pacaas Novos – Brazil
Uru-Chipaya
Chipaya – Bolivia
Trumai – Brazil
Aymara
Cayuvava – Bolivia (extinct)
Itonama – Bolivia
Movima – Bolivia

Southern South America
Guaicuruan
Pilagá – Argentina
Toba – Argentina / Paraguay
Mocoví – Argentina
Matacoan
Chorote – Argentina
Maká – Paraguay
Nivaclé – Paraguay
Wichi – Argentina
Zamucoan
Ayoreo – Paraguay / Bolivia
Mascoian
Sanapaná – Paraguay
Moseten
Mosetén (Tsimané) – Bolivia
Chon
Selknam
Tehuelche
Qawasqar
Puelche (Gününa Küne) – Argentina Pampas
Kunza – Chile (extinct)
Mapudungun – Chile / Argentina
Yagán (Yaghan)

Northeast Caucasian
Northeast Caucasian
Nakh
Chechen
Avar–Andic
Avar
Andi
Botlikh
Chamalal
Ghodoberi
Bagvalin (Bagvalal)
Tindi
Karata
Akhvakh
Tsezic
Tsez
Hinukh
Bezhta
Hunzib
Khvarshi
Lak (isolate)
Khinalug (isolate)
Dargi
Dargwa
Lezgic
Archi
Udi
Lezgi
Aghul
Tabasaran
Budukh
Rutul
Tsakhur

Indo-European
Indo-European
Hittite
Tocharian A/B
Armenian (Eastern, Western)
Albanian, Tosk
Greek (Ancient, Modern)
Indo-Iranian
Persian
Avestan
Tats (Judeo-Tat)
Sanskrit
Romani
Celtic
Irish (Old, Modern)
Breton
Welsh
Germanic
Core Germanic
English (Old, Middle, Modern)
German (Old, Middle, Modern)
Yiddish
Dutch
Gothic
Scandinavian
Old Norse
Danish
Swedish
Balto-Slavic
Baltic
Lithuanian
Latvian
Prussian
Slavic
Russian
Old Church Slavonic
Bulgarian
Serbo-Croatian
Polish
Czech
Romance
Latin
Spanish
Portuguese
Catalan
French
Italian
Romanian

Uralic
Uralic
Finnic languages
Finnish
Estonian
Hungarian
Mordvinic languages
Erzya-Mordvin
Komi
Khanty
Udmurt
Mansi
Mari
Samic languages
Northern Sami
Samoyedic
Nenets
Selkup

Tai-Kadai
Tai-Kadai
Kra
Gelao (Qau)
Gelao (Hakei)
Buyang (Langjia)
Buyang (Ecun)
Hlai
Li (Baoting)
Kam-Sui
Lakkja
Mulam
Maonan
Chadong
Kam, Southern
Sui
Tai
Zhuang (Longzhou)
Nung (Fengshan)
Nung (Lazhai)
Nung (Ningbei)
Tai Khuen
Tai Lue
Dehong
Shan
Thai (standard)
Thai (central)
Thai (Khorat)
Thai (Songkhla)

Others
Basque
Elamite
Turkic
Azerbaijan
Nogai
Kumyk
Chulym
Austronesian
Proto Austronesian
Proto Polynesian
Rotuman – Fiji
Tongan
Marquesan
Tuamotuan
Hawaiian
Māori
Rapa Nui
Afro-Asiatic
Semitic
Arabic
Aramaic
Chadic
Hausa
Polci
Nilo-Saharan
Ghulfan
Creoles
Negerhollands (Dutch-based) – U.S. Virgin Islands
Limonese Creole (English-based) – Costa Rica
Lengua (Quechua-based) – Ecuador (mixed)

See also
 All Species Foundation, another project of the foundation
 Comparative linguistics
 Comparative method
 Endangered language
 Ethnologue
 Language death
 Language revitalization
 Mass comparison
 Rosetta Project
 Swadesh list
 World Atlas of Language Structures

References

Key, Mary Ritchie & Comrie, Bernard (eds.) 2015. The Intercontinental Dictionary Series. Leipzig: Max Planck Institute for Evolutionary Anthropology.

External links
Intercontinental Dictionary Series
Guide to the Intercontinental Dictionary Series project CD-ROMs. Special Collections and Archives, The UC Irvine Libraries, Irvine, California.

Educational projects
Word lists
Linguistics websites
Linguistics databases
Lexical databases
Cross-Linguistic Linked Data